Griffins RFC is a Finnish rugby club in Kotka.

History
The club was founded in 2011.

External links
 Griffins RFC

Rugby clubs established in 2011
Finnish rugby union teams
Kotka
2011 establishments in Finland